Craig Dean Falkman (born August 1, 1943 in Saint Paul, Minnesota) is a retired professional ice hockey player who played 45 regular season games in the World Hockey Association for the Minnesota Fighting Saints in 1972-73. As an amateur, he played for the University of Minnesota men's hockey team as well as the United States national team at the 1968 Winter Olympics and also the 1967 and 1971 Ice Hockey World Championship tournaments.  He now resides in Gillette, Wyoming, practicing psychology

Career statistics

Awards and honors

External links
 
 The Complete Historical and Statistical Reference to the World Hockey Association by Scott Surgent, Xaler Press, 

1943 births
American men's ice hockey defensemen
Ice hockey people from Saint Paul, Minnesota
Ice hockey players at the 1968 Winter Olympics
Living people
Minnesota Fighting Saints players
Minnesota Golden Gophers men's ice hockey players
Olympic ice hockey players of the United States
Rochester Mustangs players
AHCA Division I men's ice hockey All-Americans